Rafael Souza or Rafael Sousa may refer to:

 Rafa Sousa (born 1988), Portuguese footballer
 Rafael Afonso de Sousa (born 1900), Portuguese modern pentathlete and shooter
 Rafael de Souza (basketball) (born 1988), basketball player in Brazil national basketball team
Rafael de Souza (canoeist) in 2015 Canoe Slalom World Cup
Rafael de Souza (futsal) in 2014 AFC Futsal Club Championship
 Rafael Diego de Souza (born 1986), Brazilian footballer
 Rafael Galhardo de Souza (born 1991), Brazilian footballer